Bravo, Bristol! was a piece of music originally written by Fred Weatherly and produced by Ivor Novello.  It was thought to be a long lost piece which was only recently discovered.  Originally written in 1914 to celebrate Bristol regiment going to fight in the First World War, which were later amagulated into the Gloucestershire Regiment.

References 

Music in Bristol
Songs written by Frederic Weatherly
1914 songs